The Diocese of Presidente Prudente is a Latin Church ecclesiastical territory or diocese of the Catholic Church in Southern Brazil. It is a suffragan diocese in the ecclesiastical province of the metropolitan Archdiocese of Botucatu.

Its cathedra is in the Catedral São Sebastião, dedicated to Saint Sebastian, in the episcopal see of Presidente Prudente.

History 
 Established on January 16, 1960, as Diocese of Presidente Prudente, on territory split off from Diocese of Assis.

Statistics 
As per 2015, it pastorally served 542,400 Catholics (93.1% of 582,700 total) on 15,513 km2 in 53 parishes and 4 missions with 67 priests (55 diocesan, 12 religious), 58 lay religious (22 brothers, 36 sisters) and 17 seminarians .

Bishops

Episcopal Ordinaries
(all native Brazilians)

Suffragan Bishops of Presidente Prudente 
 José de Aquino Pereira (1960.03.26 – 1968.05.06); previously Bishop of Dourados (Brazil) (1958.01.23 – 1960.03.26); next Bishop of Rio Preto (Brazil) (1968.05.06 – retired 1997.02.26), died 2011
 José Gonçalves da Costa, C.SS.R. (later Archbishop) (1969.11.24 – 1975.08.19); previously Titular Bishop of Rhodopolis (1962.06.25 – 1969.11.24) as Auxiliary Bishop of São Sebastião do Rio de Janeiro (Brazil) (1962.06.25 – 1969.11.24), Secretary General of National Conference of Bishops of Brazil (1964 – 1968); later Titular Archbishop of Ulcinj (1975.08.19 – 1979.04.19) as Coadjutor Archbishop of Niterói (Brazil) (1975.08.19 – 1979.04.19), succeeding as Metropolitan Archbishop of Niterói (1979.04.19 – 1990.05.09), died 2001
 Antônio Agostinho Marochi (1976.02.02 – retired 2002.02.20), died 2018; previously Titular Bishop of Thabraca (1973.09.27 – 1976.02.02) as Auxiliary Bishop of Archdiocese of Londrina (Brazil) (1973.09.27 – 1976.02.02)
 José María Libório Camino Saracho (2002.02.20 – retired 2008.04.16); previously Titular Bishop of Urusi (1999.06.16 – 2002.02.20) as Auxiliary Bishop of Diocese of São Miguel Paulista (Brazil) (1999.06.16 – 2002.02.20)
 Benedito Gonçalves dos Santos (2008.04.16 – ...).

Other priest of this diocese who became bishop
Maurício Grotto de Camargo, appointed Coadjutor Bishop of Assis, São Paulo in 2000

Sources and External links 
 GCatholic.org - data for all sections
 Catholic Hierarchy
 Diocese website 

Roman Catholic dioceses in Brazil
Roman Catholic Ecclesiastical Province of Botucatu
Religious organizations established in 1960
Roman Catholic dioceses and prelatures established in the 20th century
1960 establishments in Brazil